The Cornish Main Line  is a railway line in Cornwall and Devon in the United Kingdom. It runs from Penzance to Plymouth, crossing from Cornwall into Devon over the famous Royal Albert Bridge at Saltash.

It directly serves Truro, St Austell, Bodmin (by a Parkway station) and Liskeard. It forms the backbone for rail services in Cornwall and there are branches off it which serve St Ives, Falmouth, Newquay and Looe. The main line also carries direct trains to and from London, Birmingham, Cardiff, Manchester, the north of England and Scotland.

It is the southernmost railway line in the United Kingdom and the westernmost in England.

History

The Cornish Main Line was originally built by two separate railway companies, the West Cornwall Railway between Truro and Penzance, opened in 1852, and the Cornwall Railway between Plymouth and a separate station in Truro, opened in 1859. The West Cornwall Railway was itself based on the Hayle Railway, opened in 1837 as a purely local mineral railway.

Rail travel from Penzance to London was possible from 1860 when the West Cornwall company was given access to the Cornwall Railway’s Truro station, but the West Cornwall trains were standard gauge and the Cornwall Railway was broad gauge, so through passengers had to change trains there and goods had to be transhipped into wagons of the other gauge at Truro.

The impecunious West Cornwall company sold its railway to the more powerful broad gauge Associated Companies, dominated by the Great Western Railway, and the new owners converted the West Cornwall line to broad gauge. Through goods trains started running in 1866 and passenger trains in 1867.

The Associated Companies merged into the Great Western Railway, and in 1892 the Great Western converted all its broad gauge track to standard gauge, a process called the gauge conversion.

Both the West Cornwall and the Cornwall railways had been built cheaply and had numerous timber trestle viaducts; these were cheap to build but very expensive to maintain, as the timber decayed, and the iconic viaducts were eventually all reconstructed in masonry or masonry and wrought iron, or in a few cases by-passed. Those on the Cornwall Railway section are described at Cornwall Railway viaducts.

The most iconic structure on the route, however, is the Royal Albert Bridge spanning the River Tamar and opened in 1859; it remains in use to the present day.

During the later decades of the nineteenth century and the first half of the twentieth, the Great Western Railway was famous for providing transport to holiday destinations in Cornwall, and there were numerous branch lines served from the Cornish main line giving access to the resorts. The physical limitations of the steeply graded line imposed severe problems during the busiest times, not least for goods train operation. Equally famous was the line’s use for transporting vegetable produce from Cornwall, famously broccoli and cauliflower, and cut flowers from the Isles of Scilly.

To cope with the increasing traffic the line was gradually doubled between 1893 and 1930.

Many branch lines were closed during the second half of the twentieth century, but in Cornwall the Looe, Newquay, Falmouth Docks and St Ives branches remain open to passengers, with service frequencies on all of them having been increased in recent times. A fifth branch starts at Plymouth in Devon but crosses the Tamar en route to serve Calstock and Gunnislake in Cornwall. During the summer, the Newquay branch is also served by intercity trains to London, the North of England and Scotland. A further branch from Lostwithiel still carries local china clay trains to Fowey docks, while there are more china clay lines from Burngullow, west of St Austell, and as spurs from the Newquay and Looe branches.
The historical development of the line is more fully dealt with at Hayle Railway, West Cornwall Railway, and Cornwall Railway.

Accidents
The Cornwall Main Line has been a very safe railway for passengers, with only a few accidents in the 19th century. These include:
 Grove Viaduct, St Germans – derailment, 6 May 1859.
 St Austell – runaway train, 29 October 1872.
 Menheniot – collision, 2 December 1873.
 Bodmin Road – derailment, 13 April 1895.

Route

The communities served are: Plymouth (including the suburbs of Devonport and St. Budeaux), Saltash, St Germans, Menheniot, Liskeard, Bodmin, Lostwithiel, Par, St Austell, Truro, Redruth, Camborne, Hayle, St Erth and Penzance. In addition, there are five branch lines with passenger services:
 Atlantic Coast Line - links Par with Newquay
 Looe Valley Line - links Liskeard with Looe
 Maritime Line - links Truro with Penryn and Falmouth
 St Ives Bay Line - links St. Erth with St. Ives
 Tamar Valley Line - links Plymouth with Bere Alston, Calstock and Gunnislake

The railway stations at St Austell and Penzance are adjacent to bus stations. In addition, integrated bus services operate from Bodmin Parkway to Bodmin, Wadebridge and Padstow; from St Austell to the Eden Project; and from Redruth to Helston and RNAS Culdrose.

The route has a large number of viaducts, but the most significant structure is the Royal Albert Bridge which crosses the River Tamar at Saltash. At Truro, the viaducts give sweeping views of the city and River Fal; further west, the north coast can be seen near Hayle before the line swings onto the south coast for the last mile or so along the beach at Marazion, giving a good view of St Michael's Mount.

The route is nearly all double track and cleared for trains up to W7 and W6A gauges. It became a major cause of delays in the region, requiring trains to wait for preceding trains to clear the singled section before proceeding. The second track was restored in August 2004. The total cost of the project was £14.3 million and was funded by Objective One, Strategic Rail Authority and Cornwall County Council.

There are three remaining sections of single line, all of them 2 km or less. One of these sections is on two viaducts near Liskeard, another is between St. Budeaux Ferry Road and Saltash over the Royal Albert Bridge, and the final section is on the approach to Penzance, alongside Long Rock depot.

Usage
The number of passengers travelling on the Cornish Main Line has increased in the last few years. Between 2004/05 and 2011/12, with the exception of Keyham and Menheniot, all stations have reported an increase of at least 33% while Hayle, Par, Saltash and St Budeaux Ferry road all reported calculated to be in excess of 200%. The busiest stations are Plymouth, Penzance and Truro which all handle more than one million people arriving or departing each year. St Austell, Redruth and Liskeard all had more than 300,000 people in 2011-12, increases of around 50% or 60% over 2004/05.

See also

 Cornwall Railway
 Cornwall Railway viaducts
 Disused railway stations (Plymouth to Penzance Line)
 Great Western Main Line
 West Cornwall Railway

References

Notes

Sources and further reading
 
 
 
 
 
 

Rail transport in Cornwall
Rail transport in Devon
Railway lines in South West England
Standard gauge railways in England
Railway lines opened in 1867